Guzelkoy or Güzelköy may refer to several villages in Turkey:

Güzelköy, Ayvacık, in the District of Ayvacık, Çanakkale Province
Güzelköy, Bismil, in the District of Bismil, Diyarbakır Province 
Güzelköy, Karacasu, in the District of Karacasu, Aydın Province
Güzelköy, Nazilli, in the District of Nazilli, Aydın Province
Güzelköy, Köşk, in the District of Köşk, Aydın Province
Güzelköy, Mut, in the District of Mut, Mersin Province
Güzelköy, Tavas, in the District of Tavas, Denizli Province